The British passenger steam liner SS Leasowe Castle was built between 1915 and 1917 at Cammell Laird shipyards in Birkenhead.

The ship was originally to be called Vasilissa Sophia and destined for the National Steam Navigation Company of Greece. During construction though, the ship was commandeered by the British Government through the Liner Acquisition Scheme, to be run by the Union-Castle Line. She was finally launched on 5 April 1917 and named Leasowe Castle (a 16th-century castle on the Wirral Peninsula in North West England).

Leasowe Castle was used as a troopship in World War I.

The wake of a torpedo was spotted by the crew approaching from the port side and the ship managed to turn to limit the damage. The torpedo hit the stern and destroyed the rudder. A second torpedo was fired and narrowly missed. The ship managed to reach Gibraltar under her own power for repairs.

The ship was carrying 2,900 troops en route from Alexandria to Marseilles in France. After about 90 minutes Leasowe had sunk with the loss of 101 lives. Many men spent hours in the water. Survivors were returned to Egypt. Captain Edward John Holl went down with the ship after urging his officers to save the crew: "Do your utmost; they must be saved".

The troops who died at sea in the Mediterranean in the First World War (without a grave on land) are commemorated by the Shatby Memorial, in the cemetery at Shatby in Alexandria.

References 

Steamships of the United Kingdom
Ships sunk by German submarines in World War I
Maritime incidents in 1918
1917 ships